was a Japanese heterodox economist and public intellectual who was the Sir John Hicks Professor of Economics at the London School of Economics from 1970–88. He was also professor at Osaka University and member of the British Academy. In 1976 he won the Order of Culture (文化勲章, Bunka-kunshō).

Career
Originally desiring a career as a historical novelist, at the university Morishima pursued social science, studying both economics and sociology under Yasuma Takada. At Kyoto University, Morishima was rigorously trained in both mainstream neoclassical economic theory and Marxian economics. Mathematically gifted, in 1946, he graduated from Kyoto University and taught there in addition to Osaka University. He started Institute of Social and Economic Research (ISER) of Osaka University with Yasuma Takada.

In 1960 he established with Nobel-laureate Lawrence R. Klein from the Economics Department of the University of Pennsylvania the International Economic Review (today published by Penn), which grew to become one of the leading journals in economics in the world.

In 1965, he became the first Japanese president of the Econometric Society. By all accounts, John Hicks was a committed advocate of Morishima's careership in England.

In 1968, he immigrated to Britain, teaching at University of Essex, then accepting an endowed chair at the LSE in 1970.

Later, he started the project that led to the establishment of the Suntory-Toyota Foundation and the Suntory and Toyota International Centres for Economic and Related Disciplines (STICERD) at LSE. He was STICERD's first chairman. In 1991 he was elected Honorary Fellow of the LSE.

Contributions
Morishima's three-volume work reinterpreting and synthesizing economic ideas in the major writings of David Ricardo, Karl Marx, and Léon Walras, now largely forgotten, represents one of the high points of the radical political economy of the 1970s New Left in North America. His intense interest in general equilibrium theory, classical political economy, and capitalism drove this work. Based on LSE lectures, these books worked towards the accommodation of von Neumann's 1937 multi-sectoral growth model to a general equilibrium model. Considering the work of these theorists to be Ricardian, his three books worked to show that the modification of them along von Neumann lines elucidates the theoretical similarities and differences between the positions.

Academic positions
 1948 – Assistant at Kyoto University
 1950 – Lecturer at Kyoto University
 1950 – Assistant professor at Kyoto University
 1951 – Associate professor at Osaka University
 1963 – Professor of Economics at Osaka University
 1966 – Professor of ISER (Institute of Social and Economic *Research) at Osaka University
 1968 – Visiting professor at University of Essex
 1969 – Keynes visiting professor at University of Essex
 1970 – Professor at London School of Economics
 1982 – Sir John Hicks professor at London School of Economics

Publications
 Morishima, Michio (1952), "On the Laws of Change of the Price System in an Economy which Contains Complementary Goods", Osaka EP.
 Morishima, Michio (1952), "Consumer Behavior and Liquidity Preference", Econometrica.
 Morishima, Michio (1956), "An Analysis of the Capitalist Process of Reproduction", Metroeconomica.
 Morishima, Michio (1957), "Notes on the Theory of Stability of Multiple Exchange", RES.
 Morishima, Michio (1958), "A Contribution to the Non-Linear Theory of the Trade Cycle", ZfN.
 Morishima, Michio (1958), "A Dynamic Analysis of Structural Change in a Leontief Model", Economica.
 Morishima, Michio (1958), "Prices Interest and Profits in a Dynamic Leontief System", Econometrica.
 Morishima, Michio (1959), "Some Properties of a Dynamic Leontief System with a Spectrum of Techniques", Econometrica.
 Morishima, Michio (1960), "Existence of Solution to the Walrasian System of Capital Formation and Credit", ZfN.
 Morishima, Michio (1960), "On the Three Hicksian Laws of Comparative Statics", RES.
 
 Morishima, Michio (1960), "Economic Expansion and the Interest Rate in Generalized von Neumann Models", Econometrica.
 Morishima, Michio (1961), "Proof of a Turnpike Theorem: The `No Joint Production' Case", RES.
  
 Morishima, Michio (1961), "Generalizations of the Frobenius-Wielandt Theorems for Non- Negative Square Matrices", J of London Mathematical Society.
 Morishima, Michio (1962), "The Stability of Exchange Equilibrium: An alternative approach", IER.
 Morishima, Michio (1964), Equilibrium, Stability and Growth: A multi-sectoral analysis.
 Morishima, Michio (1966), "A Refutation of the Non-Switching Theorem", QJE.
 Morishima, Michio (1967), "A Few Suggestions on the Theory of Elasticity", Keizai Hyoron
 Morishima, Michio (1969), Theory of Economic Growth.
 Morishima, Michio (1970), "A Generalization of the Gross Substitute System", RES.
 Morishima, Michio (1971), "Consumption-Investment Frontier, Wage-Profit Frontier and the von Neumann Growth Equilibrium", ZfN.
 Morishima, Michio (1972), The Working of Econometric Models, (in collaboration with Y. Murata, T. Nosse and M. Saito).
 Morishima, Michio (1973), Marx's Economics: A dual theory of value and growth. Cambridge.
 Morishima, Michio (1973), Theory of Demand: Real and monetary, with co-authors.
 Morishima, Michio (1973), The Economic Theory of Modern Society.
 Morishima, Michio (1974), "The Frobenius Theorem, Its Solow-Samuelson Extension and the Kuhn-Tucker Theorem", with T. Fujimoto, JMathE.
  
 Morishima, Michio (1977), Walras's Economics: A pure theory of capital and money.
 
 Morishima, Michio (1978), "The Cournot-Walras Arbitrage Resource Consuming Exchange and Competitive Equilibrium", with M. Majumdar, in Hommage a Francois Perroux.
 Morishima, Michio (1982),Why Has Japan Succeeded? Western technology and the Japanese ethos.
 Morishima, Michio (1984), "The Good and Bad Uses of Mathematics", in Wiles and Routh, editors, Economics in Disarray.
 Morishima, Michio (1984), The Economics of Industrial Society.
 Morishima, Michio (1989), Ricardo's Economics.
 Morishima, Michio (1991), "General Equilibrium Theory in the 21st Century", EJ.
 Morishima, Michio (1992), Capital and Credit: A new formulation of general equilibrium theory.
 Morishima, Michio (1994), "Capital and Growth", in Homouda, The Legacy of Hicks.
 Morishima, Michio (1996), Dynamic Economic Theory.
 Morishima, Michio (1999), Why do I expect Japan to collapse? In Freedman, Craig, (ed.) Why Did Japan Stumble?: Causes and Cures. Edward Elgar, Cheltenham, UK, pp. 25–73.

References

External links

 Kyoto University
 Institute of Social and Economic Research, Osaka University
 London School Economics (LSE)
 Suntory and Toyota International Centres for Economic and Related Disciplines (STICERD) at LSE

1923 births
2004 deaths
People from Osaka Prefecture
Historians of economic thought
Kyoto University alumni
Academic staff of Kyoto University
Academic staff of Osaka University
Academics of the University of Essex
Academics of the London School of Economics
Academics of the Open University
Presidents of the Econometric Society
Fellows of the Econometric Society
Place of death missing
Fellows of the British Academy
Recipients of the Order of Culture
Econometricians
20th-century Japanese economists